Below are the squads for the Football at the 2001 Mediterranean Games, hosted in Tunis, Tunisia, and took place between 5 June and 15 September 2001. Teams were national U-21 sides.

Group A

France

San Marino

Tunisia
Head coach: Khemaïs Laabidi

Group B

Greece

Libya

Turkey

Group C

Algeria
Head coach: Mokhtar Kalem and Mustapha Seridi

Italy
Head coach:

Morocco

References

Squads
Mediterranean Games football squads